Diego De Ascentis (born 31 July 1976) is an Italian former footballer who played as a midfielder.

Club career
De Ascentis started his career at Como in 1993 before moving to Bari in 1996. Three years later, he transferred to A.C. Milan for a season.

In 2000, he transferred to Torino. After Torino went bankrupt in 2005 he moved to Genoa, joining the club in July 2005; however, Genoa was demoted to Serie C1 later that month as punishment for match-fixing, prompting De Ascentis to transfer to Livorno. After the reformed Torino regained promotion to Serie A, he rejoined the Turin club for another season.

He signed a three-year contract with Atalanta in the summer of 2007 and was released in the summer of 2009. He re-signed with the club on 8 October that year, and departed again at the end of the 2009–10 season.

International career
De Ascentis was capped for the U-21 and Olympic teams (the former of which won the 1997 Mediterranean Games).

References

External links
 Atalanta B.C. Official Player Profile
 Diego De Ascentis at FIGC.it

1976 births
Living people
Italian footballers
Italy under-21 international footballers
Como 1907 players
S.S.C. Bari players
A.C. Milan players
Torino F.C. players
U.S. Livorno 1915 players
Atalanta B.C. players
Serie A players
Serie B players
Association football midfielders
Sportspeople from Como
Mediterranean Games gold medalists for Italy
Mediterranean Games medalists in football
Competitors at the 1997 Mediterranean Games
Footballers from Lombardy